Ystradgynlais railway station served the town of Ystradgynlais in the traditional county of Breconshire, Wales. Opened in 1869 by the Swansea Vale and Neath and Brecon Junction Railway, it was eventually absorbed by the Midland Railway which closed it to passengers in 1932 although the line through the station remained open for freight for some time after that.

References 

Disused railway stations in Powys
Former Midland Railway stations
Railway stations in Great Britain opened in 1873
Railway stations in Great Britain closed in 1932